Mairwa Assembly constituency was an assembly constituency in Siwan district in the Indian state of Bihar. It was reserved for scheduled castes.

Overview
It was part of Siwan Lok Sabha constituency.

As a consequence of the orders of the Delimitation Commission of India, Mairwa Assembly constituency ceased to exist in 2010.

Election results

1977-2005
In the October 2005 state assembly elections, Ramayan Manjhi of BJP won the Mairwa (SC) assembly seat defeating his nearest rival Satyadeo Ram of CPI(M-L)L. Contests in most years were multi cornered but only winners and runners are being mentioned. Satyadeo Ram of CPI(M-L)L defeated Shiv Kumar Manjhi of RJD in February 2005, Gorakh Ram of Congress in 2000 and Giridhari Ram of CPI(M) in 1995. Gorakh Ram of Congress defeated Giridhari Ram of CPI(M) in 1990 and Independent in 1985. Ram Narain Ram of Congress defeated Giridhari Ram of CPI(M) in 1980. Phul Chand Ram of JP defeated Ram Narain Ram of Congress in 1977.

References

Former assembly constituencies of Bihar
Politics of Siwan district